The Junior League of Salt Lake City is a women's group of trained volunteers who provide time and money to improve the lives of women and children in our community.  

The Junior League of Salt Lake City, Inc. is a charitable organization of women committed to promoting voluntarism, developing the potential of women and improving communities through the effective action, education and leadership of trained volunteers. In 2003-04 the Junior League of Salt Lake City donated approximately 20,000-25,000 volunteer hours and $200,000 to address critical issues in our community.

Headquarters
The Junior League of Salt Lake City is located at 526 East 300 South in Salt Lake City.  The building was purchased and remodeled by the Junior League of Salt Lake City in 2000 using funds donated in a capital campaign.  It houses the administrative offices of the league, meeting rooms that are available for use by the community, and the Women Helping Women clothing closet.

History
The Junior League of Salt Lake City became a member of the Association of Junior Leagues International in 1931.  The Junior League has performed many valuable projects in the Salt Lake City area.

Notable past projects

1930s
Family Service Society
YWCA
Children's Theatre Project
Neighborhood House Nursery School

1940s
Traveler's Aid Society
Art Barn
Red Cross
Central Volunteer Bureau

1950s
Hearing and Speech Foundation
Utah Education TV Channel (KUTV) founded in collaboration with the University of Utah
"Number Seven Sunny Street" TV program by League members on KUED-TV

1960s
Salt Lake Art Center
Community Mental Health Center
Utah Museum of Natural History (UMNH)
Utah Heritage Foundation

1970s
Junior Science Academy at UMNH
Wheeler Farm
KUER-FM
Rape Recovery Center

1980s
Ronald McDonald House
S.T.A.R. - Hansen Planetarium

1990s
Utah AIDS Foundation
Alliance House
Children's Justice Center
The Sharing Place
Art Space

2000s
Celebration of Life (in partnership with Community Nursing Services)
Freedom Garden (in partnership with Volunteers of America, Utah)
Refugee Integration Into Society through Education (RISE) in partnership with Catholic Community Services
Educating Parents, Investing in Children (EPIC) in partnership with Salt Lake CAP Head Start at Palmer Court

Current projects
The Junior League of Salt Lake City currently has two League-owned projects, The Junior League CARE Fair and Women Helping Women.  The Junior League CARE Fair is the largest free health care fair in the state of Utah.  It is held each July to provide routine medical services and community assistance information. Women Helping Women is a project in which Junior League volunteers collect and distribute donated professional women's clothing. These clothes are donated to women entering the workforce and who are in transition towards self-sufficiency. Clients are referred to the project by government and social service agencies.
The Junior League also runs Mini-Projects, which are typically done-in-a-day projects to help local organizations with smaller projects or portions of larger projects.  The Junior League provides volunteers and funding to support these projects.

External links
 Junior League of Salt Lake City - official site

Organizations based in Salt Lake City
Women in Utah
Junior League